Proprioseiopsis edbakeri is a species of mite in the family Phytoseiidae.

References

edbakeri
Articles created by Qbugbot
Animals described in 1967